Heron's Ghyll is a hamlet in the Wealden district of East Sussex.  St John the Evangelist Church is a Catholic church in the village. There is a late 19th-century garden laid out by the poet Coventry Patmore in the village.

References

Hamlets in East Sussex
Buxted
Maresfield